Gao Dalun (born 7 March 1997) is a Chinese footballer currently playing as a left winger for Nantong Zhiyun.

Club career
Gao Dalun would play for the Jiangsu Suning youth team before going on to be promoted to their senior team. He would even be part of the squad that won the 2020 Chinese Super League title. His time at the club would end when the clubs owners were in financial difficulties and dissolved the team. He would go on to join second tier club Nantong Zhiyun and go on to make his debut in a league game on 16 May 2021 against Chengdu Rongcheng in a 2-1 defeat. He would go on to establish himself within the team and helped the club gain promotion to the top tier at the end of the 2022 China League One season.

Career statistics
.

Honours

Club
Jiangsu Suning
Chinese Super League: 2020

References

External links

1997 births
Living people
Chinese footballers
China youth international footballers
Association football midfielders
China League One players
Jiangsu F.C. players
Nantong Zhiyun F.C. players